Petrovouni (Greek: Πετροβούνι) may refer to several places in Greece:

Petrovouni, Achaea, a village in the municipality of Aigialeia, Achaea 
Petrovouni, Arcadia, a village in Arcadia
Petrovouni, Ioannina, a village in the municipality of North Tzoumerka in the Ioannina regional unit
Petrovouni, Laconia, a village in the municipality of East Mani in Laconia 
Petrovouni, Messenia, a village in the municipality of West Mani in Messenia